Glendurgan Garden (meaning deep valley of otters) is a National Trust garden situated above the hamlet of Durgan on the Helford River and near  Mawnan Smith, in the civil parish of Mawnan, Cornwall, England, United Kingdom.

Glendurgan Garden was laid out by Alfred Fox in the 1820s and 1830s. In 1962 Glendurgan Garden was given to the National Trust by Cuthbert and Philip Fox.

The garden is notable for a cherry laurel maze, created in 1833.

References

 
Note: Charles Fox is a great-grandson of the founder of the garden at Glendurgan, Alfred Fox. In this book he gives some personal memories of the garden and the Fox family, together with some family history.

Views of Glendurgan

External links

Glendurgan Garden information at the National Trust

Gardens in Cornwall
National Trust properties in Cornwall
Fox family of Falmouth
Mazes
Mawnan